Mohamed Nadim (born 20 July 2001) is an Egyptian professional footballer who plays as a goalkeeper for Egyptian Premier League club Zamalek.

References

Egyptian footballers
Living people
2001 births
Zamalek SC players